Léalvillers is a commune in the Somme département in the Hauts-de-France region of France.

Geography

Population

See also
Communes of the Somme department

References

External links

 Léalvillers on the Quid website 

Communes of Somme (department)